Little Big League was an American rock band from Philadelphia, Pennsylvania.

Little Big League began in October 2011. They were signed to Tiny Engines and Run for Cover Records, and released two studio albums: These Are Good People in 2013 and Tropical Jinx in 2014.

After frontwoman Michelle Zauner's mother was diagnosed with cancer in 2014, she moved back to Eugene, Oregon. Working under the name Japanese Breakfast, she recorded two digital releases, American Sound and Where Is My Great Big Feeling?, and in April 2016, released the album Psychopomp on Yellow K Records.

Little Big League returned for a few shows in 2016, but effectively broke up after that as Zauner focused on Japanese Breakfast and guitarist Kevin O'Halloran joined the band Mercury Girls.

Band members
 Michelle Zauner – vocals, guitar
 Deven Craige – bass
 Kevin O'Halloran – guitar
 Ian Dykstra – drums

Discography
Studio albums
These Are Good People (2013)
Tropical Jinx (2014)

EPs
Little Big League (2012)

Splits
Little Big League/Ovlov (2014)

References

External links
 
 

American emo musical groups
Indie rock musical groups from Pennsylvania
Musical groups from Philadelphia
Run for Cover Records artists
Tiny Engines artists